Clemens Wenzeslaus Brentano (also Klemens; pseudonym: Clemens Maria Brentano ; ; 9 September 1778 – 28 July 1842) was a German poet and novelist, and a major figure of German Romanticism. He was the uncle, via his brother Christian, of Franz and Lujo Brentano.

Biography

Clemens Brentano was born to Peter Anton Brentano and Maximiliane von La Roche, a wealthy merchant family in Frankfurt on 9 September 1778. His father's family was of Italian descent. His maternal grandmother was Sophie von La Roche. His sister was writer Bettina von Arnim, who, at a young age, lionised and corresponded with Goethe, and, in 1835, published the correspondence as Goethes Briefwechsel mit einem Kinde (Goethe's correspondence with a child). Clemens Brentano studied in Halle and Jena, afterwards residing at Heidelberg, Vienna and Berlin. He was close to Wieland, Herder, Goethe, Friedrich Schlegel, Fichte and Tieck.

From 1798 to 1800 Brentano lived in Jena, the first center of the romantic movement. In 1801, he moved to Göttingen, and became a friend of Achim von Arnim. He married writer Sophie Mereau on 29 October 1803. In 1804, he moved to Heidelberg and worked with Arnim on Zeitungen für Einsiedler and Des Knaben Wunderhorn. After his wife Sophie died in 1806 he married a second time in 1807 to Auguste Bussmann (whose half-sister, Marie de Flavigny, later by marriage the Countess Marie d'Agoult, would become the companion of pianist and composer Franz Liszt). In the years between 1808 and 1818, Brentano lived mostly in Berlin, and from 1819 to 1824 in Dülmen, Westphalia.

In 1818, weary of his somewhat restless and unsettled life, he returned to the practice of the Catholic faith and withdrew to the monastery of Dülmen, where he lived for some years in strict seclusion. He took on there the position of secretary to the Catholic visionary nun, the Blessed Anne Catherine Emmerich.

It was claimed that from 1802 until her death she bore the wounds of the Crown of Thorns, and from 1812 the full stigmata, a cross over her heart and the wound from the lance. Clemens Brentano made her acquaintance in 1818 and remained at the foot of the stigmatist's bed copying her dictation until 1824. When she died, he prepared an index of the visions and revelations from her journal, The Dolorous Passion of Our Lord Jesus Christ (published 1833). One of these visions made known by Brentano later resulted in the identification of the putative House of the Virgin Mary in Ephesus by Abbé Julien Gouyet, a French priest, during 1881. However, some posthumous investigations in 1923 and 1928 made it uncertain how much of the books he attributed to Emmerich were actually his own creation and the works were discarded for her beatification process.

The latter part of his life he spent in Regensburg, Frankfurt and Munich, actively engaged in promoting the Catholic faith. Brentano assisted Ludwig Achim von Arnim, his brother-in-law, in the collection of folk-songs forming Des Knaben Wunderhorn (1805–1808), which Gustav Mahler drew upon for his song cycle. In 1835, Swiss painter Emilie Linder, painted the famous portrait of him. He died in Aschaffenburg.

Brentano, whose early writings were published under the pseudonym Maria, belonged to the Heidelberg group of German romantic writers, and his works are marked by excess of fantastic imagery and by abrupt, bizarre modes of expression. His first published writings were Satiren und poetische Spiele (Leipzig, 1800), a romance Godwi oder Das steinerne Bild der Mutter (2 vols., Frankfort, 1801), and a musical drama Die lustigen Musikanten (Frankfort, 1803). Of his dramas the best are Ponce de Leon (1804), Victoria und ihre Geschwister (Berlin, 1817) and Die Grundung Prags (Pesth, 1815).

On the whole his finest work is the collection of Romanzen vom Rosenkranz (published posthumously in 1852); his short stories, and more especially the charming Geschichte vom braven Kasperl und dem schönen Annerl (1817), which has been translated into English, were very popular.

Brentano's collected works, edited by his brother Christian, appeared at Frankfurt in 9 vols. (1851–1855). Selections have been edited by J. B. Diel (1873), M. Koch (1892), and J. Dohmke (1893). See J. B. Diel and William Kreiten, Klemens Brentano (2 vols, 1877–1878), the introduction to Koch's edition, and R. Steig, A. von Arnim und K. Brentano (1894).

In his honor the Clemens Brentano prize is awarded for German literature.

Musical settings and cultural references
Richard Strauss set six poems by Brentano in Sechs Lieder, Op. 68, in 1918, which are also known as his Brentano Lieder.

Brentano's work is referenced in Thomas Mann's novel Doctor Faustus. A cycle of thirteen songs, based on Brentano's poems, is noted in Chapter XXI as one of the composer protagonist's most significant early works.

Poems
Eingang
Frühlingsschrei eines Knechtes
Abendständchen
Lore Lay
Auf dem Rhein
Wiegenlied
An Sophie Mereau
Ich wollt ein Sträusslein binden
Der Spinnerin Lied
Aus einem kranken Herzen
Hast du nicht mein Glück gesehen?
Frühes Lied
Schwanenlied
Nachklänge Beethovenscher Musik
Romanzen vom Rosenkranz
Einsam will ich untergehn
Rückblick

Religious works
 Die Barmherzigen Schwestern in Bezug auf Armen- und Krankenpflege (Care of the Poor and Sick by the Sisters of Mercy ) (1831) (New Edition edited by Renate Moering)
 Lehrjahre Jesu (The Formative Years of Jesus) (1822) Part I and II (Edited by Jürg Mathes); 1983 edition by W. Kohlhammer, Berlin – 
 Das bittere Leiden unsers Herrn Jesu Christi (The Dolorous Passion of Our Lord Jesus Christ) (1858-1860 in a reworked edition by Karl Erhard Schmoeger; first authentic edition 1983, New edition by Bernhard Gajek and Irmengard Schmidbauer) , 
 Das Leben der heil.
 Biographie der Anna Katharina Emmerick (Biography of Anna Katharina Emmerich) (unfinished, 1867–1870 in Schmoeger's edition; first authentic edition 1981)
 Tagebuchaufzeichnungen: Geheimnisse des Alten und des Neuen Bundes: Aus den Tagebüchern des Clemens Brentano (Notes from a Diary: Secrets of the Old and New Testaments from the Diaries of Clemens Brentano) ,

Fairy tales

References

Sources
 Phillips, H. A., "Brentano, Clemens Maria" Cassell's Encyclopedia of World Literature New York: Funk & Wagnalls, 1953.

Further reading
 Blamires, David. "15. Clemens Brentano’s Fairytales". In: Telling Tales: The Impact of Germany on English Children’s Books 1780-1918. Cambridge: Open Book Publishers, 2009. pp. 263–274. . Web généré le 23 septembre 2021: <http://books.openedition.org/obp/614>.

External links

 
 
 
 
 
 
 
 
 
 
 
 
 
 
 

1778 births
1842 deaths
Writers from Koblenz
People from the Electorate of Trier
German people of Italian descent
German Roman Catholics
Roman Catholic writers
German Catholic poets
Converts to Roman Catholicism
Arnim family
Martin Luther University of Halle-Wittenberg alumni
Academic staff of the University of Marburg
German male poets